Plaza-Midwood is a neighborhood located approximately one mile to the northeast of Uptown in Charlotte, North Carolina. The neighborhood is roughly bound by Hawthorne Lane to the west, The Plaza to the north, Briar Creek Road and the Charlotte Country Club to the east and Central Avenue to the south.

Locally known as one of Charlotte's most diverse and eclectic neighborhoods, it is filled with art galleries, funky stores, and restaurants. Just south of Central Avenue in the Plaza-Midwood neighborhood is the 19 acre Veterans Park.

History
Plaza-Midwood was first established in 1910 as a streetcar suburb of Charlotte. The Oakland Land Company was responsible for the layout of the roads within the neighborhood. Through the Great Depression, Plaza-Midwood would thrive, before its decline commenced in the 1950s.

By 1975, the Plaza Midwood Neighborhood Association was established to protect and preserve the neighborhood.

Since the mid-1990s, the area has seen a dramatic comeback as reinvestment has transformed once dilapidated homes into funky urban dwellings. It continued redevelopment has spilled over into other surrounding neighborhoods, and resulted in the overall renaissance of the former inner-ring suburbs of old Charlotte.

Plaza-Midwood's Historic District is located in the western section of the neighborhood and is maintained by residents and business operators. The area along The Plaza, Thomas Avenue and parts of Pecan and Clement were designated as a Local Historic District in 1992. The district is now regulated by the Historic District Commission.

Demographics

As of 2010, Plaza-Midwood had a population of 3,993. The racial makeup of the neighborhood was 84.2% White American, 8.2% Black or African American, 1.6% Asian American, and 2.8% of some other race. Hispanic or Latino American of any race were 3.2% of the population. The median household income for the area was $97,576.

Transportation infrastructure

Mass transit
The following buses from the Charlotte Area Transit System (CATS) serve the Plaza-Midwood neighborhood:
 #4 (Country Club)
 #9 (Central Avenue)
 #17 (Commonwealth)
 #39 (Eastway)

Five stops are planned for the future CityLynx Gold Line streetcar, with stations proposed for Hawthorne at Barnhardt, the Plaza, St. Julien Street, Iris Drive, and Morningside Drive. There are also possible plans for a stop along the future Silver Line light rail in Plaza-Midwood, though an alignment for the line hasn't been finalized.

Roads
The major thoroughfares are Central Avenue, Hawthorne Lane and The Plaza.

Bars, Restaurants & Shopping

Bars  
Thomas Street Tavern
Legion Brewing
Pilot Brewing
Burial Craft Beer Co 
Catawba Brewing Company Charlotte
Common Market
Hattie's Tap & Tavern
Members Only Tasting Room & Social
Resident Culture Brewing
Rumaway Cave 
The Hop Shop 
The Workman's Friend 
Thirsty Beaver Saloon 
Whiskey Warehouse

Restaurants  
Zada Jane's Corner Cafe
Snooze A.M Eatery
Bistro La Bon
Midwood Smokehouse
Diamond Restaurant
Calle Sol
SupperLand
YAFO Kitchen
Abugida Ethiopian Café & Restaurant
Akahana Asian Bistro
Central Coffee Co.
Cheat's Cheesesteak Parlor
Cold Hearted Gelato
Dave's Hot Chicken
Deli St
Dish
Emmy Squared
Enat Ethiopian Restaurant
Fuel Pizza
Giddy Goat Coffee Roasters
House of Pizza
Intermezzo
Las Delicias Bakery 
Letty's on Shamrock
Lulu's Maryland Style Chicken & Seafood
Mama's Caribbean Grill & Bar
Marble Slab Creamery
Mattie's Diner
Milkbread
Moo & Brew
Paper Plane Deli & Market
Peculiar Rabbit
Pho Hoa
Pure Pizza
ShareTea
Smooth Monkey
Sosu
Soul Central
Summit Coffee
The Good Wurst Company
The Grinning Mule
The Pizza Peel
The Amigos Mexican Grill & Cantina 
Two Scoops Creamery
Undercurrent Coffee
Warmack
Vilani's Bakery

Shopping  
Moxie Mercantile
Book Buyers 
CLTCH 
Gumbo Goods 
Betty by Moxie Mercantile
Black Sheep 
Boris & Natasha
Charlotte Collective
House of Africa
I've Read It In Books 
Lunchbox Records 
Midwood Barbers
Roam & Dwell
Slate Interiors 
Social Status
Value Village Thrift Store
White Rabbit

Education and libraries

School system
Residents of Plaza-Midwood attend Charlotte-Mecklenburg Schools, including Eastway Middle School, Garinger High School and Shamrock Gardens Elementary School.

Libraries

Plaza-Midwood is served by the Plaza Midwood branch of the Public Library of Charlotte and Mecklenburg County.  The library is located on the corner of the Central Avenue and the Plaza.

References in popular culture

Pop musician Jon Lindsay included a reference to the neighborhood (in which he also owns a home) in the title of his official label debut LP, Escape From Plaza-Midwood, released August 17, 2010 on Chocolate Lab Records. Plaza Midwood was also used as Little Korea for the USA Network pilot for the show "The Novice" in December 2013

References

Further reading

External links

 
 neighborhood web site
 Charlotte Neighborhood Quality Of Life Study for Plaza-Midwood from CharMeck.org
 Charlotte Mecklenburg Historic Landmarks Commission driving tour of Plaza-Midwood

Streetcar suburbs
Neighborhoods in Charlotte, North Carolina
Gay villages in the United States
Economy of Charlotte, North Carolina
Populated places established in 1910